Frederick George Kitton (5 May 1856 – 10 September 1904) was a British wood-engraver, author, and illustrator. He is best known for illustrating and editing the works of Charles Dickens.

Life
Born at Norwich, Frederick George Kitton went at age seventeen to London as an apprentice and was trained as a draughtsman and wood-engraver by W. L. Thomas, the managing director of The Graphic and one of the leading practitioners of the technique at the time. Kitton contributed to several art periodicals, such as The Art Journal and Magazine of Art, and in 1882 began literary work. He illustrated, edited or wrote several books, most of which were related to the work of Charles Dickens. He annotated the 1900 'Rochester' edition of Dickens's work.

Selected works

; 

;

References

External links

1856 births
1904 deaths
British printmakers
Artists from Norwich
British non-fiction writers
19th-century English writers
Writers from Norwich